Pathfinder FC (formerly FC Málaga City New York) is a soccer club from Dutchess County, New York competing in the Northeast Division of USL League Two.

History
Founded as part of the Beekman Soccer Club, they operated as a team of the club - BSC Wolves, before launching separately, under their new name (FC Málaga City New York) in 2019.

The club was affiliated with the FC Málaga City Academy of Spain. Every year, FC Málaga City New York would send its entire academy to Spain to train and compete for three months, and the club's coaches come from their Spanish parent club and all hold UEFA certifications. The team was affiliated with Pathfinder Academy, with its players attending the school.

In August 2021, the club cut ties with its Spanish affiliate amid concerns over playing opportunities for their players and re-branded Pathfinder FC.

Year-by-year

References

USL League Two teams
Men's soccer clubs in New York (state)
Association football clubs established in 2013
2013 establishments in New York (state)
Dutchess County, New York